Plinga is an Online F2P games publisher located in Berlin, Germany. The company is partnered with leading web and mobile web developers, publishing their games to Plinga's network of selected partner portals and social networks across the globe. Plinga was founded in June 2009.

List of Plinga Games 
 Family Barn
 Farm Days
 Dreamfields
 World Poker Club
 SkyDale
 Charm Farm
 Klondike
 Knights and Brides
 Gem Legends
 Royal Story
 Need a Hero
 Castle
 Cinderella Story
 Indy Cat
 MoonStars

References 

Companies based in Berlin
Video game publishers
Video game companies of Germany